Young's interference experiment, also called Young's double-slit interferometer, was the original version of the modern double-slit experiment, performed at the beginning of the nineteenth century by Thomas Young. This experiment played a major role in the general acceptance of the wave theory of light. In Young's own judgement, this was the most important of his many achievements.

Theories of light propagation in the 17th and 18th centuries
During this period, many scientists proposed a wave theory of light based on experimental observations, including Robert Hooke, Christiaan Huygens and Leonhard Euler.  However, Isaac Newton, who did many experimental investigations of light, had rejected the wave theory of light and developed his corpuscular theory of light according to which light is emitted from a luminous body in the form of tiny particles. This theory held sway until the beginning of the nineteenth century despite the fact that many phenomena, including diffraction effects at edges or in narrow apertures, colours in thin films and insect wings, and the apparent failure of light particles to crash into one another when two light beams crossed, could not be adequately explained by the corpuscular theory which, nonetheless, had many eminent supporters, including Pierre-Simon Laplace and Jean-Baptiste Biot.

Young's work on wave theory

While studying medicine at Göttingen in the 1790s, Young wrote a thesis on the physical and mathematical properties of sound and in 1800, he presented a paper to the Royal Society (written in 1799) where he argued that light was also a wave motion.  His idea was greeted with a certain amount of skepticism because it contradicted Newton's corpuscular theory.
Nonetheless, he continued to develop his ideas. He believed that a wave model could much better explain many aspects of light propagation than the corpuscular model:

In 1801, Young presented a famous paper to the Royal Society entitled "On the Theory of Light and Colours" which describes various interference phenomena. In 1803, he described his famous interference experiment. Unlike the modern double-slit experiment, Young's experiment reflects sunlight (using a steering mirror) through a small hole, and splits the thin beam in half using a paper card. He also mentions the possibility of passing light through two slits in his description of the experiment:

The figure shows the geometry for a far-field viewing plane. It is seen that the relative paths of the light travelling from the two points sources to a given point in the viewing plane varies with the angle θ, so that their relative phases also vary.  When the path difference is equal to an integer number of wavelengths, the two waves add together to give a maximum in the brightness, whereas when the path difference is equal to half a wavelength, or one and a half etc., then the two waves cancel, and the intensity is at a minimum.

The linear separation (distance) -  between fringes (lines with maximum brightness) on the screen is given by the equation :

The angular spacing of the fringes, is then given by

where  <<1, and λ is the wavelength of the light.  It can be seen that the spacing of the fringes depends on the wavelength, the separation of the holes, and the distance between the slits and the observation plane, as noted by Young.

This expression applies when the light source has a single wavelength, whereas Young used sunlight, and was therefore looking at white-light fringes which he describes above.  A white light fringe pattern can be considered to be made up of a set of individual fringe patterns of different colours.  These all have a maximum value in the centre, but their spacing varies with wavelength, and the superimposed patterns will vary in colour, as their maxima will occur in different places. Only two or three fringes can normally be observed. Young used this formula to estimate the wavelength of violet light to be 400 nm, and that of red light to be about twice that – results with which we would agree today.

In the years 1803–1804, a series of unsigned attacks on Young's theories appeared in the Edinburgh Review. The anonymous author (later revealed to be Henry Brougham, a founder of the Edinburgh Review) succeeded in undermining Young's credibility among the reading public sufficiently that a publisher who had committed to publishing Young's Royal Institution lectures backed out of the deal. This incident prompted Young to focus more on his medical practice and less on physics.

Acceptance of the wave theory of light
In 1817, the corpuscular theorists at the French Academy of Sciences which included Siméon Denis Poisson were so confident that they set the subject for the next year's prize as diffraction, being certain that a particle theorist would win it.  Augustin-Jean Fresnel submitted a thesis based on wave theory and whose substance consisted of a synthesis of the Huygens' principle and Young's principle of interference.

Poisson studied Fresnel's theory in detail and of course looked for a way to prove it wrong being a supporter of the particle theory of light. Poisson thought that he had found a flaw when he argued that a consequence of Fresnel's theory was that there would exist an on-axis bright spot in the shadow of a circular obstacle blocking a point source of light, where there should be complete darkness according to the particle-theory of light. Fresnel's theory could not be true, Poisson declared: surely this result was absurd. (The Poisson spot is not easily observed in everyday situations, because most everyday sources of light are not good point sources. In fact it is readily visible in the defocused telescopic image of a moderately bright star, where it appears as a bright central spot within a concentric array of diffraction rings.)

However, the head of the committee, Dominique-François-Jean Arago thought it was necessary to perform the experiment in more detail. He molded a 2-mm metallic disk to a glass plate with wax. To everyone's surprise he succeeded in observing the predicted spot, which convinced most scientists of the wave-nature of light. In the end, Fresnel won the competition.

After that, the corpuscular theory of light was vanquished, not to be heard of again till the 20th century. Arago later noted that the phenomenon (which is sometimes called the Arago spot) had already
been observed by Joseph-Nicolas Delisle

See also 
 Corpuscular theory of light
 Photoelectric effect
 Wave–particle duality

References
Footnotes

Citations

Interference
Physics experiments